Lycaeopsis is a genus of crustaceans belonging to the monotypic family Lycaeopsidae.

The species of this genus are found in America and New Zealand.

Species:

Lycaeopsis themistoides 
Lycaeopsis zamboangae

References

Amphipoda